Andrei Trofimov may refer to
 Andrei Leonidovich Trofimov, ambassador of Russia to Nepal
 Andrei Mikhailovich Trofimov (b. 1985), Russian footballer with FC Neftekhimik Nizhnekamsk
  (1911−1943), World-war II soldier and Hero of the Soviet Union